Lalaquiz District is one of eight districts of Huancabamba Province, Peru.

History 
Lalaquiz District was created by law on December 30, 1983, in Fernando Belaúnde's term.

Authorities

Mayors 
 2011-2014: Antonio Francisco Huamán Huamán, Movimiento Agro Si.
 2007-2010: Idelso Manuel Garcia Correa.

See also 
 Administrative divisions of Peru

References

External links 
 INEI Peru